This is a listing of the horses that finished in either first, second, or third place and the number of starters in the Breeders' Cup Juvenile Turf Sprint, a race run on grass on Friday of the Breeders' Cup World Thoroughbred Championships.

References 

Juvenile Turf Sprint
Lists of horse racing results